The Diamond DART is a series of tandem, two-seat civilian and military turboprop trainers manufactured by Austrian Diamond Aircraft, "DART" meaning Diamond Aircraft Reconnaissance Trainer.

Development

The DART-450 made its first flight on 17 May 2016.
Certification of the $3.1 million plane was expected by the end of 2017.
The first two deliveries were to be for a non-certificated kit version in 2017, while a certificated aircraft was expected to be delivered in September 2018. Diamond intends to deliver 50 aircraft per year.
The third prototype was expected to fly in late 2017, powered by a 550hp (410kW) GE Aviation engine.

Design
The DART-450 is built predominately from carbon fibre. It is powered by a  Ivchenko-Progress Motor Sich AI-450S turboprop engine, driving a five-bladed MT Propeller. The cockpit accommodates two crew on ejection seats. The avionics are provided by Garmin and the fuselage is able to mount an optional retractable surveillance camera, plus other equipment.

Variants
Diamond DART-450
 first flown on 17 May 2016:  Ivchenko-Progress Motor Sich AI-450S turboprop,  empty,  max takeoff.
Diamond DART-550
Version powered by a  General Electric GE H75-100 turboprop, first flown on 24 May 2018: eight hours endurance, Martin-Baker MK16 ejection seats, Garmin G3000 cockpit, 1,600 kg (3,527 lbs) OEW, 2,400 kg (5,291 lbs) MTOW.
Diamond DART-750
CETC TA-20
Chinese licensed locally manufactured variant of the DART-450 utilizing alternate Chinese avionics. It is being pitched as a possible candidate for the development of a basic military trainer aircraft for the People's Liberation Army Air Force.

Specifications (DART-450, utility (reconnaissance) configuration)

See also

References

External links

 
 

Dart series
Single-engined tractor aircraft
Low-wing aircraft
Single-engined turboprop aircraft
Aircraft first flown in 2016